Bru or Ploganes is a village in the municipality of Kvam in Vestland county, Norway. It's located in the Strandebarm area, on the northern shore of the Hardangerfjorden.

Bru was the administrative centre of Strandebarm municipality from 1838 until 1965 when the municipality was dissolved and this area was merged into Kvam. Strandebarm Church is located in Bru.

References

Kvam
Villages in Vestland